Crocus Plains Regional Secondary School is a secondary school in Brandon, Manitoba. The school opened in September 1974.

Notable alumni
Mike McEwen (curler), Curler
Landon Rice, Football Player
Kevin Boyd, Coach
Eric Boyd, Football Player

References

High schools in Manitoba
Educational institutions established in 1973
1973 establishments in Manitoba

Education in Brandon, Manitoba
Buildings and structures in Brandon, Manitoba